Peter Middleton may refer to:

 Sir Peter Middleton (banker) (born 1934), British businessman, banker and Chancellor of the University of Sheffield
 Peter Middleton (footballer) (1948–1977), English footballer
 Peter Middleton (motorcyclist)  (1931–2019), British motorcycle rider
 Peter Middleton (MP) (1603–1661), English merchant and politician
 Capt. Peter Middleton (1920–2010), grandfather of Catherine, Duchess of Cambridge